The Theoretical Minimum: What You Need to Know to Start Doing Physics is a popular science book by Leonard Susskind and George Hrabovsky. The book was initially published on January 29, 2013 by Basic Books.

The Theoretical Minimum is a book and a Stanford University-based continuing-education lecture series, which became a popular YouTube-featured content. The series commenced with What You Need to Know (above) reissued under the title Classical Mechanics: The Theoretical Minimum.

The series presently stands at three books (as of mid 2021) covering the first three of six core courses devoted to: classical mechanics, quantum mechanics, special relativity and classical field theory, general relativity, cosmology, and statistical mechanics. Videos for all of these courses are available online. In addition, Susskind has made available video lectures over a range of supplement subject areas including: advanced quantum mechanics, the Higgs boson, quantum entanglement, string theory, and black holes. The full series delivers over 100 lectures amounting to something on the order of 200 hours of content, with some of the individual lectures having received over a million YouTube views.

What You Need to Know book overview
The book is a mathematical introduction to various theoretical physics concepts, such as principle of least action, Lagrangian mechanics, Hamiltonian mechanics, Poisson brackets, and electromagnetism. It is the first book in a series called The Theoretical Minimum, based on Stanford Continuing Studies courses taught by world renowned physicist Leonard Susskind. The courses collectively teach everything required to gain a basic understanding of each area of modern physics, including much of the fundamental mathematics.

Full lecture series

Core Course 1: Classical Mechanics
The book, also published in 2014 by Penguin Books under the title Classical Mechanics: The Theoretical Minimum, is complemented by video recordings of the complete lectures which are available on-line. There is also a supplemental website for the book.

Core Course 2: Quantum Mechanics
The second book in the series, by Leonard Susskind and Art Friedman, was published in 2014 by Basic Books under the title Quantum Mechanics: The Theoretical Minimum. Video recordings of the complete lectures are available on-line.

Core Course 3: Special Relativity and Classical Field Theory
The third book in the series, by Leonard Susskind and Art Friedman, was published in 2017. This covers special relativity and classical field theory.

Core Course 4: General Relativity
The fourth book in the series, by Leonard Susskind and André Cabannes, was published in January 2023. This covers the general theory of relativity.

Core Courses 5-6
Lectures in the remaining two courses, on the subjects of:
 Cosmology.
 Statistical mechanics.
are available on-line as video recordings, or in written notes

Supplemental Courses
Further lecture courses in the Theoretical Minimum series have been delivered by Susskind, on these subjects (or with these titles): 
 Advanced quantum mechanics.
 Higgs boson.
 Quantum entanglement.
 Relativity.
 Particle Physics 1: Basic Concepts.
 Particle Physics 2: Standard Model.
 Particle Physics 3: Super-symmetry and Grand Unification.
 String theory.
 Cosmology and black holes.

These are also available on-line as video recordings.

References

External links

 The Theoretical Minimum website at the Stanford Institute for Theoretical Physics.
 Solutions to The Theoretical Minimum, Classical Mechanics by Filip Van Lijsebetten.
 Solutions to The Theoretical Minimum, Quantum Mechanics by Filip Van Lijsebetten.

Popular physics books
2013 non-fiction books
Basic Books books